César Lecat baron de Bazancourt (1810–1865) was a French military historian, director of the library of Compiègne under Louis Philippe.

He was born in Paris and was appointed official historiographer by Napoleon III, whom he accompanied during several campaigns. The results of these expeditions appeared in his works on L'Expédition de Crimée jusqu'à la prise de Sébastopol, chronique de la guerre d'Orient (1856); La campagne d'Italie de 1859, chronique de la guerre (1859); and Les expéditions de Chine et de Cochinchine (two volumes, 1861–62).

Other works

History  
Histoire de Sicile sous la domination des Normands (1846)  
Novels  
Georges le montagnard (1851)  
Noblesse oblige (1851)  
La princesse Pallianci (1852)

External links
 

French people of the Crimean War
1810 births
1865 deaths
French male non-fiction writers
19th-century French historians
19th-century French male writers